List of congenital disorders

Numerical 
 5p syndrome - see Cri du chat syndrome

A 

 Albinism
 Amelia and hemimelia
 Amniotic band syndrome
 Anencephaly
 Angelman syndrome
 Aposthia
 Arnold–Chiari malformation

B 
 Bannayan–Zonana syndrome
 Bardet–Biedl syndrome
 Barth syndrome
 Basal-cell nevus syndrome
 Beckwith–Wiedemann syndrome 
 Benjamin syndrome
 Bladder exstrophy
 Bloom syndrome
 Brachydactyly
 Breathing Genitalia

C 
 Cat eye syndrome
 Caudal regression syndrome
 Sotos syndrome Cerebral Gigantism
 CHARGE syndrome
 Chromosome 16 abnormalities
 Chromosome 18 abnormalities
 Chromosome 20 abnormalities
 Chromosome 22 abnormalities
 Cleft lip/palate
 Cleidocranial dysostosis
 Club foot
 Congenital adrenal hyperplasia (CAH)
 Congenital central hypoventilation syndrome
 Congenital diaphragmatic hernia (CDH)
 Congenital Disorder of Glycosylation (CDG)
 Congenital hyperinsulinism
 Congenital insensitivity to pain with anhidrosis (CIPA)
 Congenital pulmonary airway malformation (CPAM)
 Conjoined twins
 Costello syndrome
 Craniopagus parasiticus
 Cri du chat syndrome
 Cyclopia
 Cystic fibrosis

D 
 De Lange syndrome
 Diphallia
 Distal trisomy 10q
 Down syndrome

E 
 Ectodermal dysplasia
 Ectopia cordis
 Ectrodactyly
 Encephalocele

F 
 Fetal alcohol syndrome
 Fetofetal transfusion
 First arch syndrome
 Freeman–Sheldon syndrome

G 
 Gastroschisis
 Genu recurvatum
 Goldenhar syndrome

H 
 Harlequin-type ichthyosis
 Heart disorders (Congenital heart defects)
 Hemifacial microsomia
 Holoprosencephaly
 Huntington's disease
 Hirschsprung's disease, or congenital aganglionic megacolon
 Hypertrichosis
 Hypoglossia
 Hypomelanism or hypomelanosis (albinism)
 Hypospadias
 Haemophilia
Heterochromia
 Hemochromatosis

I 
 Imperforate anus
 Imperforate hymen
 Incontinentia pigmenti
 Intestinal neuronal dysplasia
 Ivemark syndrome

J 
 Jacobsen syndrome

K 

 Katz syndrome
 Klinefelter syndrome
 Kabuki syndrome
 Kyphosis

L 
 Larsen syndrome
 Laurence–Moon syndrome
 Lissencephaly
 Lordosis

M 
 Macrocephaly
 Marfan syndrome
 Microcephaly
 Micromelia
 Microtia
 Monosomy 9p
 Myasthenic syndrome
 Myelokathexis

N 
 Nager's Syndrome
 Nail–patella syndrome
 Neonatal jaundice
 Neurofibromatosis
 Neuronal ceroid lipofuscinosis
 Noonan syndrome
 Nystagmus

O 
 Ochoa syndrome
 Oculocerebrorenal syndrome
 Oligodactyly

P 
 Pallister–Killian syndrome
 Pectus excavatum
 Pectus carinatum
 Phocomelia
 Pierre Robin syndrome
 Poland syndrome
 Polydactyly
 Polymelia
 Polysyndactyly
 Prader–Willi syndrome
 Proteus syndrome
 Prune belly syndrome

R 
 Radial aplasia
 Rett syndrome
 Robinow syndrome
 Rubinstein–Taybi syndrome

S 
 Saethre–Chotzen syndrome
 Schizencephaly
 Scoliosis
 Sickle cell disease
 Sirenomelia
 Situs inversus
 Smith–Lemli–Opitz syndrome
 Smith–Magenis syndrome
 Spina bifida
 Stickler Syndrome
 Strabismus
 Sturge–Weber syndrome
 Symbrachydactyly
 Syndactyly
 Syphilis, congenital

T 
 Teratoma
 Treacher Collins syndrome
 Trichothiodystrophy
 Triple-X syndrome
 Trisomy 13
 Trisomy 9
 Turner syndrome

U 
 Umbilical hernia
 Usher syndrome

W 
 Waardenburg syndrome
 Werner syndrome
 Wolf–Hirschhorn syndrome
 Wolff–Parkinson–White syndrome

See also
 ICD-10 Chapter Q: Congenital malformations, deformations and chromosomal abnormalities
 List of ICD-9 codes 740–759: congenital anomalies
 Rare disease